The Samsung BlackJack II, or Samsung SGH-i617, is a smartphone available through AT&T in the United States.  It is the successor to the Samsung BlackJack. Canadian version, SGH-i616 is marketed as "Samsung Jack" by Rogers and Fido. The phone has since been succeeded by the Samsung Epix.

The phone comes in black, burgundy, blue, & pink.

Specifications

Specifications from the Samsung website:

 Screen size: 2.4 inches
 Screen resolution: 320 x 240 pixels, 65K color TFT display
 Input method: QWERTY keypad with backlight and jog wheel
 Operating System: Windows Mobile 6 (can now be updated to Windows Mobile 6.1)
 Processor: 260 MHz Texas Instruments OMAP 1710 
 Storage: External microSD slot, supports up to 4 GB SDHC cards
 Voice Commands (When Updated to Windows Mobile 6.1)
 Flash Memory: 128 MB RAM, 256 MB ROM
 Modes: Quad-band GSM (850, 900, 1800, and 1900)
 Data connection: 3G (UMTS and HSDPA at 850,1900,2100 MHz. Canadian version, SGH-i616 does not support UMTS 2100, only 850/1900, which makes 3G speeds not accessible in Europe) and 2G (EDGE and GPRS)
AGPS on-board
 Bluetooth 2.0
 2.0 megapixel camera that can take photographs and videos
 Multiple resolutions: 1600 x 1200, 640 x 480, 320 x 240, and 176 x 144
 4X digital zoom
 Self timer
 Multi-shot
 Brightness level adjustment
 No flash
 Supported video formats: MPEG4, H.263, WMV
 Battery: Removable 3.7 Volt Lithium-ion, 1,700 mAh, up to 7 hours of talk time and up to 14 days of standby
 Size: 4.4 x 2.3 x 0.4 inches
 Weight: 3.52 ounces

Unpublished features

 Upper indicator-light color meanings:
 Purple: message sent/received
 Blue: Bluetooth activated/deactivated/Alarm
 Amber: problem with connection
 Red: charging or battery low
 Green: fully charged
 Home Screen Status Indicators:
 3G: connected to 3G service
 E: connected to EDGE service
 G: connected to WAP service
 Wi-fi: Yes "Good quality"

References

External links 
 Official Samsung Blackjack II site
 Samsung Galaxy Beyond X Smartphone to Sport Hexa Cameras and 5G Support
 Reviews:  c|net, phoneArena, Washington Post
 Resources:  MyBlackjack2.com
 Resources:  Samsung Windows Mobile support

Samsung mobile phones
Mobile phones introduced in 2006
Mobile phones with an integrated hardware keyboard